Nicasio Silverio (December 27, 1930 – July 25, 2016) was a Cuban swimmer. He was born in Havana and competed in the freestyle events. Silverio twice competed for his native country at the Summer Olympics: 1948 and 1952. He won the bronze medal in the men's 100 m freestyle event at the 1951 Pan American Games. He was inducted into the Cuban Hall of Fame for Swimming.

References

 Nicasio Silverio's profile at Sports Reference.com

1930 births
2016 deaths
Cuban male freestyle swimmers
Olympic swimmers of Cuba
Swimmers at the 1948 Summer Olympics
Swimmers at the 1951 Pan American Games
Swimmers at the 1952 Summer Olympics
Sportspeople from Havana
Pan American Games bronze medalists for Cuba
Pan American Games medalists in swimming
Medalists at the 1951 Pan American Games